Celebrity Coach Trip 3 was the third series of Celebrity Coach Trip, airing from 16th to 27th January 2012. Filming for the series took place from 4th to 18th July 2011.  The pair who lasted until the end and were voted the most popular by the rest of the group received a £1000 prize for charity. This coach trip took place across the Mediterranean, beginning in Trieste, Italy and continuing to Ljubljana, Slovenia.

Voting system
The Voting system on this series was:
  Days 1 to 6 a yellow card
  Days 7 to 9 an automatic red card

Contestants
 Indicates that the couple were aboard the coach
 Indicates that the couple were immune from votes
 Indicates that the couple were voted as the most popular couple and won the series 
 Indicates that the couple were voted as the second most popular couple 
 Indicates that the couple were voted as the third most popular couple
 Indicates that the couple got a yellow card
 Indicates that the couple got a red card

Voting history

The trip by day

References

2012 British television seasons
Coach Trip series
Television shows set in Croatia
Television shows set in Italy
Television shows set in Slovenia